This list of Filmfare Award records is current as of the 66th Filmfare Awards ceremony, held on 28 March 2021, which honored the best films of 2020.

Artists with all nominations in a single category

Most awards for a single film
Films with most number of award wins are.

Most nominations for a single film

Most awards won by a male

Most awards won by a female

Most awards for Best Director

Most awards for Best Actor

Most awards for Best Actor (critics)

Most awards for Best Actress

Most awards for Best Actress (critics)

Most awards for Best Supporting Actor

Most awards for Best Supporting Actress

Most awards for Best Music Director

Most awards for Best Lyricist

Most awards for Best Male Playback Singer

Most awards for Best Female Playback Singer

Most awards for Best Choreography

Most consecutive wins in a single category

 Kumar Sanu holds the record of winning 5 consecutive Best Male Playback Singer awards won between 1991 and 1995.
 Arijit Singh holds the record of winning 5 consecutive Best Male Playback Singer awards won between 2016 and 2020.
 Asha Bhonsle holds the record of winning 4 consecutive Best Female Playback Singer awards won between 1972 and 1975.
 Laxmikant Pyarelal holds the record of winning 4 consecutive Best Music Director awards won between 1978 and 1981.
 Kishore Kumar holds the record of winning 4 consecutive Best Male Playback Singer awards won between 1983 and 1986.
 A. R. Rahman holds the record of winning 4 consecutive Best Music Director awards won between 2007 and 2010.

See also
Filmfare Awards

References

Filmfare Awards
Bollywood film awards
Indian film award winners